Stéphane Auvray (born 4 September 1981) is a Guadeloupean former professional footballer who played as a midfielder. He served as captain of the Guadeloupe national team.

Club career
Born in Les Abymes, Guadeloupe, Auvray grew up in Saint Martin
and moved on to Europe to join Stade Malherbe Caen's youth system in 1994. With Caen, he featured with the club's reserve team in the Championnat de France amateur. In 2002, Auvray signed with amateur club GSI Pontivy and spent two seasons at the club. In 2004, he joined Vannes OC and had a successful career at the club spending five seasons there and amassing over 150 appearances for the club. During his time with Vannes, he helped the club achieve promotion to the professional division Ligue 2. In 2009, Auvray joined Nîmes Olympique, but after six months departed the club for personal reasons.

In January 2010, he signed with Major League Soccer club Kansas City Wizards. He was traded to New York Red Bulls on 12 August 2011 after requesting to be transferred. New York announced in December that it would not exercise its contract option on Auvray.

In December 2012, he signed with Brunei DPMM FC together with João Moreira as a foreign player for the 2013 S.League season. However, his stay in Brunei was brief as he was released by May 2013.

International career
Auvray made his major tournament debut for Guadeloupe at the CONCACAF Gold Cup in June 2007 against Haiti. The team made it to the semi-finals but was eliminated by Mexico. Auvray renewed the experience for the 2009 CONCACAF Gold Cup, this time leading the team as captain. He scored one goal during the competition against Nicaragua. Guadeloupe qualified for the Quarter Finals but were eliminated by Costa Rica.

Managerial career
Auvray was named manager of Saint Martin in 2019.

Personal life
Auvray is married to a Trinidadian woman. His son Kaïlé Auvray is a footballer who plays for the Trinidad and Tobago national team.

Career statistics
Scores and results list Guadeloupe's goal tally first, score column indicates score after each Auvray goal.

Honours
Vannes
 Coupe de la Ligue: runner-up 2008–09

Individual
 CONCACAF Gold Cup All-Tournament Team: 2009

References

External links

Jouer pour la Guadeloupe est légitime - Vannes MaVille

 Stéphane Auvray Interview

1981 births
Living people
People from Les Abymes
Guadeloupean footballers
Guadeloupe international footballers
Saint Martin national football team managers
Association football midfielders
Stade Malherbe Caen players
US Changé players
Major League Soccer players
Singapore Premier League players
Nîmes Olympique players
Sporting Kansas City players
New York Red Bulls players
Vannes OC players
GSI Pontivy players
DPMM FC players
2007 CONCACAF Gold Cup players
2009 CONCACAF Gold Cup players
2011 CONCACAF Gold Cup players
Expatriate footballers in France
Expatriate soccer players in the United States
Expatriate footballers in Singapore
Expatriate footballers in Brunei